The Hochschule Mittweida is a public university of applied science located in Mittweida, Germany, founded in 1867.

History
The University of Applied Sciences Mittweida is the second-largest public university of applied sciences in Saxony. It has had almost 80,000 alumni from almost 40 countries worldwide. Founded in 1867 as “Technicum”, the university first served the education of machine-building engineers, and it was one of the largest private schools in Germany at the turn of the century. After the takeover by the National Socialists, the “Technicum” lost its status as a private school, and in 1935 became the “Engineering School Mittweida” (Ingenieurschule Mittweida). In the 1960s, due to the success of the electrotechnical training program, the school became the “Engineering College Mittweida”. In 1980, it received the right to award the academic degree of “doctor engineer”. In 1992, after the reunification, the college received a new start as a university of applied sciences.

Famous graduates
 August Arnold (1898-1983), co-founder of ARRI, developer of the first single lens reflex camera
 August Horch (1868–1951), the father of the German automotive giant Audi, studied at the „Technicum“ from 1888-1891. Horch developed the first six-cylinder engine in 1907. The designation Audi is the Latin translation of the name Horch (having to do with hearing).
 Walter Bruch (1908–1990) studied from 1928-1931 in Mittweida, before he invented the PAL color television system. The PAL system is in about 60 countries, the most widespread colour television system worldwide, aside from NTSC and SECAM.
 Gerhard Neumann (1917–1997) studied from 1936-1938 in Mittweida. Hired as a testing engineer at General Electric, he developed the jet-engine J-79 and led the company's aircraft engine division (which today is called GE Aviation) as vice president for about 16 years. He received numerous awards, e.g. the „Collier Trophy“, awarded by the admission in the „National Aviation Hall of Fame“ of the US.

See also 
Education in Germany
German universities
Free State of Saxony
Germany

References 

Notes
 brochure Mittweida Ingenieur in aller Welt, published by Hochschule Mittweida (FH) University of Applied Sciences
 brochure Hochschule Mittweida - University of Applied Sciences, published by Hochschule Mittweida University of Applied Sciences

External links 

Educational institutions established in 1867
Universities and colleges in Saxony
Mittweida
Universities of Applied Sciences in Germany
1867 establishments in Germany